Mickey Simmonds (born 31 January 1959, Chesterfield, Derbyshire, England) is an English  session keyboardist, arranger and composer. He is best known for his work with progressive rock acts, Mike Oldfield, Renaissance, Camel and Fish. He has also worked with Joan Armatrading, Paul Young, The Rutles, Art Garfunkel, Kiki Dee, Mastermind, John Coghlan's Diesel Band, Elkie Brooks, Judie Tzuke, Imagination, Bucks Fizz, Jennifer Rush, The Bonzo Dog Doo-Dah Band, the list goes on.
 
Simmonds had a long-standing relationship with Neil Innes, hence The Rutles (including all the arrangements on Archaeology 1996) and The Bonzo Dog Doo-Dah Band, whose studio album Pour l'Amour des Chiens was co-produced by Simmonds & Innes.

Simmonds has released two solo albums, The Shape of Rain (1996) and The Seven Colours of Emptiness (2009).

As influences, he cites progressive rock acts such as early Genesis, Emerson, Lake & Palmer and Pink Floyd.

Personal life
Simmonds currently resides in the village of Hersham. He has a wife, Sarah, two children, Kyle and Charlie, 2 granddaughters Scarlet & Bonnie, & is a keen golfer.

Mike Oldfield
Simmonds played on two albums: Islands (1987), and Heaven's Open (1991); one compilation: The Complete Mike Oldfield (1985), and toured with Mike 1983 -1993.

Fish
Simmonds was the dominant writer on Fish's 1990 solo debut Vigil in a Wilderness of Mirrors, also co-wrote all tracks on the follow-up album Internal Exile and performed on the tours promoting these albums. Fish described him as the musical director of his early solo years. He left in 1992, but later returned for the tour promoting Sunsets on Empire (1997) and co-wrote two and performed on three tracks on Raingods with Zippos (1999).

Camel
Simmonds toured with Camel during the tour following the Dust and Dreams album release in 1992 (which had featured Ton Scherpenzeel on keyboards), performances of which appeared on the Camel live album Never Let Go (1993); he also played on the subsequent studio album Harbour of Tears (1996).

Renaissance
Simmonds appeared on Tuscany (2001) and the live album In the Land of the Rising Sun: Live in Japan 2002.

XII Alfonso
Simmonds worked with the French band from Bordeaux XII Alfonso on The Lost Frontier (1996), Odyssées (1999), Claude Monet vol.2 1889–1904 (2005), Charles Darwin (Fall 2011).

References

External links
 Mickey Simmonds official site
 The Mods

1959 births
Living people
English keyboardists
Camel (band) members
People from Chesterfield, Derbyshire
People from Hersham
Renaissance (band) members